IQs is the plural form of intelligence quotient.

IQS or IQs can also refer to:
 Chemical Institute of Sarrià (Spanish: Instituto Químico de Sarriá, Catalan: Institut Químic de Sarrià), an institute with the two schools IQS School of Engineering and IQS School of Management
 Incident Qualification System, a software developed by the U.S. National Association of State Foresters
 Initial Quality Study, an annual automotive industry study which measures problems experienced within the first 90 days of ownership, with a lower number meaning fewer experienced problems